is a metro station on the  Osaka Metro Imazatosuji Line in Higashiyodogawa-ku, Osaka, Japan.

Lines

 (Station Number: I13)

Layout
There is an island platform with two tracks underground.  The platform is fenced with platform gates.

Higashiyodogawa-ku, Osaka
Osaka Metro stations
Railway stations in Japan opened in 2006